Blacklisted was an American hardcore punk band from Philadelphia, Pennsylvania. They have toured North America, Europe, Australia, New Zealand, and Japan.

History
The band formed in the early 2000s, and comprised George Hirsch (vocals), Jon Nean (guitar), Tim Smith (bass), and Zach Trotta (drums). The band self-released their debut self-titled 7-inch EP in 2003. This led to a deal with the Stillborn label, and another EP, Our Youth Is Wasted. Pepito left to form Reign Supreme. The band then recorded a series of split releases for the Deathwish label, who also reissued the band's first two releases together as We're Unstoppable, described by PopMatters as "a furiously brief dose of old-school punk and hardcore dissonance". The band's release, No One Deserves To Be Here More Than Me, featured a stylistic turn to an early 90s grunge sound, abandoning most of the speed and favoring heavy, repetitive grooves.

In November 2013, Blacklisted frontman George Hirsch released an acoustic solo album titled There's Honey In the Soil So We Wait for the Till under the moniker Harm Wülf.

Blacklisted began writing a fourth studio album and follow up to 2009's No One Deserves To Be Here More Than Me in late 2013. Their fourth studio album titled When People Grow, People Go was produced by Will Yip and was released in February of 2015 through Deathwish. The album's sound is a mix of Blacklisted's style on the experimental album No One Deserves To Be Here More Than Me with the style on the hardcore album Heavier Than Heaven, Lonelier Than God.

Members

Final members 

 Shawn Foley - drums
 George Hirsch - vocals (2003-2018)
 Jon Nean - guitars (2003-2018)
 Dave Walling - bass

Former members 
 Jay Pepito - guitars (2004)
 Tim Smith - bass (2003-????)
 Zach Trotta - drums (2003-????)

Discography
Studio albums
...The Beat Goes On (Deathwish, 2005)
Heavier Than Heaven, Lonelier Than God (Deathwish, 2008)
No One Deserves To Be Here More Than Me (Deathwish, 2009)
When People Grow, People Go (Deathwish, 2015)

Compilations
We're Unstoppable (Deathwish, 2005)

Extended plays
Demo (Walk All Night, 2003)
Our Youth Is Wasted (Walk All Night, Stillborn), 2003)
The Dead Man's Hand 03 Split [w/ First Blood] (Deathwish, 2004)
Live from Nowhere, USA (6131, 2006)
Peace on Earth, War on Stage (Deathwish, 2007)
Eccentrichine (Six Feet Under, 2010)
So, You Are A Magician? (Six Feet Under, 2012)
Live On BBC 1 (Six Feet Under, 2012)
Dry Shaving b/w Please Go Away (Six Feet Under, 2017)
Slow Moments b/w I Should've Been A Murderer (Six Feet Under, 2018)
IV.MMXVIII (Control Records, 2018)

Music videos
 "I Am Weighing Me Down" (2008)
 "Turn in the Pike" (2015)

Compilation appearances
Generations (Revelation, 2005)

References

External links
Blacklisted on Myspace
Blacklisted on Bandcamp
Deathwish, Inc.

2018 disestablishments in Pennsylvania
Deathwish Inc. artists
Musical groups from Philadelphia
Musical quartets
Hardcore punk groups from Pennsylvania